The Oregon State University Foundation is an American private nonprofit corporation dedicated to enhancing the mission of Oregon State University in Corvallis, Oregon. The OSU Foundation is governed by a volunteer Board of Trustees.

Mission 

The mission of the Oregon State University Foundation is to "partner with Oregon State University to engage our community, inspire investment and steward resources to enhance the university’s excellence and impact."

History 

In 1947, Robert M. Kerr, Edwin B. Aldrich and E. C. Sammons established the Oregon State College Foundation with the aid of OSC President A. L. Strand. They saw the foundation as a means of creating opportunities that the college could not fulfill with state funds alone. That year they collected the OSC Foundation's first donation, a sum of five dollars. The OSC Foundation officially became the Oregon State University Foundation on November 14, 1962.

The university's endowment began with $20,000 in 1961. It took 16 years to reach its first $1 million in total receipts, and four more years to double that amount. Today the university's composite endowment totals more than $819 million, with earnings distributed annually.

With university leaders, the OSU Foundation publicly launched Oregon State's first comprehensive fundraising campaign, The Campaign for OSU, on October 26, 2007, with a goal of $625 million. Donors exceeded the original goal in October 2010, nearly a year ahead of schedule, and the goal was increased to $850 million. In March 2012 the goal was raised to $1 billion. At OSU's annual State of the University address in Portland on January 31, 2014, President Edward J. Ray announced that campaign contributions had passed $1 billion, putting Oregon State with a group of 35 other public universities to cross the billion-dollar fundraising mark and one of only two organizations in the Pacific Northwest to reach the $1 billion campaign milestone. The Campaign for OSU concluded on December 31, 2014, with more than $1.1 billion from 106,000 donors.

The OSU Foundation and the OSU Alumni Association were integrated in 2017 to coordinate fundraising activities and alumni engagement in service to the university.

On October 14, 2022, the OSU Foundation and university leaders publicly launched Oregon State’s second university-wide fundraising and engagement campaign, Believe It: The Campaign for Oregon State University. Since this campaign began in 2017, donors have committed more than $1 billion to support university priority initiatives toward the $1.75 billion goal.

References

External links 

Official website

Oregon State University
Organizations based in Oregon
1947 establishments in Oregon